Eintracht Bad Kreuznach is a German association football club from city of Bad Kreuznach, Rhineland-Palatinate. They are among the most successful amateur football teams in southwestern Germany but, after a couple of consecutive relegations, now find themselves in the tier eight Bezirksliga Nahe.

History
The club was established as Fußball Club Kreuznach on 18 June 1902 and later, in 1907 merged with Sport Club 1906 Kreuznach to become 1. FC Kreuznach. This side was joined on 19 August 1932 with Fußballsportverein 07 Kreuznach.

During the World War II, the club became part of the first division Gauliga Mittelrhein when that circuit was expanded from 10 to 21 teams and split into the Gauliga Köln-Aachen and Gauliga Moselland. They finished atop the Moselland Gruppe Ost, but then lost the divisional playoff to FV Stadt Düdelingen, a club from German-occupied Luxemburg. Kreuznach remained part of Gauliga competition until the end of the 1943–44 season, after which the war overtook the region and play in the division was suspended.

Eintracht Bad Kreuznach played one year in the 2nd Bundesliga, which was during the 1975/76 season.

In 2000, the club advanced to the Oberliga Südwest (IV) where they played until being sent down to the Verbandsliga Südwest (V) after a 17th place Oberliga result in 2008. What followed was two more relegations and an insolvency in 2011, caused by a debt of Euro 110,000, which took the club to the eighth tier, Bezirksliga Nahe.

The club began its recovery in 2011–12 when it took out the Bezirksliga title and earned promotion to the Landesliga again. It lasted for only one season before dropping back to the Bezirksliga in 2013. Another Bezirksliga title in 2015 took the club back to the Landesliga once more, followed by promotion back to the Verbandsliga in the 2015–16 season.

Stadium
Until 1965, the team played in the Eintracht-Sportfeld Heidenmauer. The record attendance for this ground was somewhere between 23,000 and 25,000 for the first match of the 1950–51 season when they were beaten 2:4 by 1. FC Kaiserslautern.

On 11 June 1965 Eintracht opened the Freidrich Moebus Stadium which was initially certified to hold 15,000. This was increased to 20,000 but has since been decreased to only 10,000. In 2005 the city of Bad Kreuznach paid to replace the old wooden benches in the stands with modern plastic seats in the course of an unsuccessful attempt to win designation as a training venue for the 2006 World Cup held in Germany.

Honours
The club's honours:

League 
 2nd Oberliga Südwest (II)
 Runners-up: 1954
 Amateurliga Südwest (III)
 Champions: 1964, 1972, 1973, 1975
 Verbandsliga Südwest (V)
 Champions: 2000
 Bezirksliga Nahe
 Champions: 2012, 2015

Cup
 South West Cup
 Winners: 1977, 1978

Recent seasons
The recent season-by-season performance of the club:

With the introduction of the Regionalligas in 1994 and the 3. Liga in 2008 as the new third tier, below the 2. Bundesliga, all leagues below dropped one tier.

References

External links
 Official website  (offline)
Eintracht Bad Kreuznach at Weltfussball.de
Das deutsche Fußball-Archiv historical German domestic league tables 

Football clubs in Germany
Football clubs in Rhineland-Palatinate
Association football clubs established in 1902
1902 establishments in Germany
Bad Kreuznach
2. Bundesliga clubs